This is a list of earthquakes in 1986. Only earthquakes of magnitude 6 or above are included, unless they result in damage or casualties, or are notable for some other reason.  All dates are listed according to UTC time.

By death toll

By magnitude

By month

January

February

March

April

May

June

July

August

September

October

November

References 

earthquakes
1986
1986
1986